was a Japanese philosopher associated with the postwar  Kyoto School. He graduated in philosophy from Kyoto University in 1943, and trained in a kamikaze human torpedo (gyorai:魚雷) squad. His main professional interest in philosophy were in the fields of logic, and American pragmatism, especially with its founding fathers Charles Sanders Peirce, William James and John Dewey. He was emeritus professor at Kyoto University.

Works 
Ueyama Shunpei Chosakushū, Hōzōkan, Tokyo, 10 volumes
Rekishi bunseki no hōhō, San'ichi Shobō, Tokyo 1962
Benshōhō no keifu, Miraisha, Tokyo 1963
Meiji ishin no bunseki shiten, Kōdansha, Tokyo 1968
Nihon no shisō, Kōbundō, Tokyo 1965
Kamigami no taikei, 2 vols Chūō Kōronsha, Tokyo 1972,1975
Rekishi to kachi, Iwanami Shoten, Tokyo 1972
Uzumoreta kyozō, Iwanami Shoten, Tokyo 1977
Tetsugaku no tabi kara, Asahi Shinbunsha, Tokyo 1979
Dai Tōa sensō no isan, Chūkō Sōsho, Tokyo 1972
(with Umehara TakeshiNihongaku no kotohajime Shogakkan
(with Sasaki Kōmei and Nakao SasukeShōyō-jurin bunka, Iwanami Shoten, Tokyo 2 vols, 1969,1976
(with Kajiyama Yūichi(梶山雄一) )Bukkyō shisō, Chūō Kōronsha, Tokyo 1974

References 

1921 births
2012 deaths
Japanese Buddhists
Academic staff of Kyoto University
Kyoto University alumni
People from Wakayama Prefecture
Recipients of the Order of the Rising Sun, 2nd class
Recipients of the Medal with Purple Ribbon
Japanese logicians
Pragmatists
20th-century Japanese philosophers